Robbie Brown (born 30 November 1990) is a Northern Irish former professional ice hockey forward. He played in the Elite Ice Hockey League for his hometown Belfast Giants during the 2009–10 season and the 2013–14 season. He last played for the Streatham Redskins in the National Ice Hockey League who he joined towards the end of the 2014–15 season. Brown had re-signed with the Redskins for the 2015–16 season on the 22nd of June 2016, but two months later they announced that he had opted to remain in Belfast for a career outside of hockey which ultimately ended his playing career.

External links

1990 births
Living people
Sportspeople from Belfast
Basingstoke Bison players
Belfast Giants players
Ice hockey forwards from Northern Ireland
Invicta Dynamos players
National Ice Hockey League players
Peterborough Phantoms players
Solway Sharks players
Wightlink Raiders players